Bricio is a surname. People with the surname include:

Carlos Pérez de Bricio (1927–2022), Spanish politician and businessman
Francisco de Bricio (1890–1978), Brazilian rower
Samantha Bricio (born 1994), Mexican volleyball player

Portuguese-language surnames
Spanish-language surnames